Alan Jackson is a recurring character in The Sarah Jane Adventures. Alan is introduced as the father of main character Maria Jackson. Alan was portrayed by Joseph Millson.

Alan's minor storylines within the series is being hypnotized by the Bane, turned to stone by the Gorgon and finding out the truth about Sarah Jane. After finding out about Sarah Jane and her gang, Alan assisted on three occasions.

Backstory
As a youth, Alan Jackson loved to skateboard, and even showed off his skateboarding skills when he was older. It was mentioned by Chrissie that on one of their dates they went on a treasure hunt. He was, by trade, a computer security consultant. As a result, he had considerable computer expertise, particularly in systems penetration, a.k.a. "hacking", as well as some unorthodox contacts.

Appearances
Alan is first seen moving into Bannerman Road with his daughter Maria. It is soon learned that Alan and Maria's mum Chrissie have divorced and that's the reason they have moved house. Alan is later taken over by the Bane due to drinking a drink called Bubble Shock.

Alan is then seen decorating Maria's bedroom with her. The next day he talks about his past as a computer technician and how he fitted computers into school's that looked just like Maria's. Sarah Jane later asks Alan if she can look at the plans he had for the job.

When Chrissie moves in due to her and her boyfriend having a row over a Salsa teacher, Maria is thrilled to have her back but Alan isn't. Alan confronts Chrissie about the consequences of her just showing up. Alan is later turned to stone by the Gorgon but is soon changed back thanks to an alien talisman.

Alan accompanied Sarah Jane, Maria, Luke and Clyde to a skate park where they all had fun skating even though Luke was unable to do it. The next day, Alan had no knowledge of who Sarah Jane or Luke was. It was later revealed that Sarah Jane had been swapped for Andrea Yates her best friend who died when she was a teenager. When his daughter was erased from history by The Trickster, only Alan could remember her thanks to an alien device given to Maria by Sarah Jane, which in turn came from the Verron soothsayer. When he interrogated Andrea Yates about Maria's disappearance, the Graske chased him and tried to remove him from time. However, Alan trapped the Graske and forced it to tell him where Maria went. When the day was saved, he was very surprised to find out what his daughter had really been doing with Sarah Jane Smith.

With his eyes now opened to the existence of alien life forms, Alan at first experienced a knee-jerk reaction which led him to consider selling his house and moving Maria away from Sarah Jane. Alan is then shocked to find people talking on the news claiming that Luke was their missing son. Alan was then furious when he learned that Chrissie had called the police on Sarah Jane. Alan later had cryptic messages from Clyde warning him about Sarah Jane being in danger from Mr Smith. Alan and Maria also learned that Luke's “real parents” were really Slitheen. Alan later assisted his daughter and Sarah Jane in defeating Mr Smith's attempt to destroy the world.

It was mentioned by Luke that Alan and Maria were in Cornwall during the Dalek invasion.

Alan was offered a job in the United States which shocked everyone but he eventually accepted the job. Before leaving for America, Alan assisted the gang in getting information about the Sontarans with Chrissie eventually finding out the secret of what Sarah Jane and her gang does.

Months later, Alan and Maria are called to assist Luke and Rani in rescuing Clyde from his father who was slowly turning into a Berserker. Alan hacked the UNIT database to get information. Alan then called Sarah Jane offscreen.

Reception
In a review for Whatever Happened to Sarah Jane?, the reviewer describes Millson as Alan “He's been an amiable if slightly dim presence throughout the series but here, Alan does a lot of the dramatic heavy lifting and crucially, moves forward.”

References

The Sarah Jane Adventures characters
Fictional hackers
Television characters introduced in 2007
Male characters in television